Ajoux is a commune in the Ardèche department in the Auvergne-Rhône-Alpes region of southern France.

The inhabitants of the commune are known as Ajouxois or Ajouxoises

Geography
Ajoux is located some 100 km south by south east of Lyon and 100 km north by north-east of Avignon.  The south of the commune is traversed by the D122 road which runs west from the D104 in a circuitous route through the commune then north-west to Mezilhac. It is possible to access the hamlet of Blaizac from this road via small mountain roads. The D361 runs off this road to the north through the commune to Ajoux village.  It continues through the village to join the D244 within the commune.  The D244 links La Pervenche in the north-west by a circuitous route through the commune and continues east passing near the hamlet of Mauves and joining the D344 near Pranles. The D261 follows the Auzene next to the northern border but does not link to the commune.

In addition to Ajoux, there are only the small hamlets of Blaizac and Mauves.

The northern border of the commune is delineated by the Auzene river and many streams flow from the commune north to join this river including the Auzener which forms the western border of the commune. The Auzene with many more tributaries downstream eventually joins the Eyneux river which eventually joins the Rhone at La Voulte-sur-Rhône.

The commune appears mountainous with forests and wasteland. There are two quarries but no farming.

Neighbouring communes and towns

Administration

List of successive mayors of Ajoux

Population

Distribution of age groups

The population of the town is much older than the departmental average.

Percentage Distribution of Age Groups in Ajoux and Ardèche Department in 2017

Source: INSEE

Sites and monuments
The best known is the Ajoux Rock.

(Not to be confused with the Roche d'Ajoux in the Rhône department)

See also 
 Communes of the Ardèche department

References

External links

Ajoux Official website 
Ajoux on the old IGN website 
Ajoux on Géoportail, National Geographic Institute (IGN) website 
Ajou on the 1750 Cassini Map

Communes of Ardèche